Milan Majstorović (born 28 January 1983) is a Serbian professional basketball coach and former player who is an assistant coach for Crvena zvezda U19.

Coaching career 
In 2021, Crvena zvezda hired Majstorović as their new assistant coach for the under-19 team. He was also appointed to the 2022–23 coaching staff.

References

External links
 Milan Majstorović at acb.com
 Milan Majstorović at euroleague.com
 Milan Majstorović at eurobasket.com
 Milan Majstorović at fiba.com

1983 births
Living people
ABA League players
Bàsquet Manresa players
Bilbao Basket players
BKK Radnički players
OKK Beograd players
Centers (basketball)
EWE Baskets Oldenburg players
KK Crvena zvezda youth coaches
KK FMP (1991–2011) players
KK Spartak Subotica players
Liga ACB players
Serbian men's basketball coaches
Serbian men's basketball players
Serbian expatriate basketball people in Germany
Serbian expatriate basketball people in Hungary
Serbian expatriate basketball people in Poland
Serbian expatriate basketball people in Spain
Basketball players from Novi Sad
Power forwards (basketball)
Trefl Sopot players